Owain Jones may refer to:

 Owain Jones (geographer) (born 1957), professor of environmental humanities
 Owain Jones (footballer, born 1996), Welsh footballer
 Owain Tudur Jones (born 1984), Welsh footballer
 Owain Jones (priest) (born 1921), Welsh Anglican priest
 Owain Jones (cricketer) (born 1992), English cricketer